Charles Stewart (May 30, 1836 – September 21, 1895) was a U.S. Representative from Texas.

Biography
Born in Memphis, Tennessee, Stewart moved to Texas in 1845 with his parents, who settled in Galveston. He attended the common schools, and later studied law. He was admitted to the bar in 1854 and commenced the practice of law in Marlin, Texas. He served as prosecuting attorney for the thirteenth judicial district from 1856 to 1860. He served as delegate to the secession convention in 1861.

Stewart enlisted in the Confederate States Army and served throughout the Civil War, first in the Tenth Regiment of Texas Infantry and later in Baylor's Cavalry. He moved to Houston in 1866 and resumed the practice of law. He was city attorney of Houston 1874–1876. He served as member of the Texas Senate from 1878 to 1882.

Stewart was elected as a Democrat to the Forty-eighth and to the four succeeding Congresses (March 4, 1883 – March 3, 1893). He was not a candidate for renomination in 1892. He resumed the practice of his profession in Houston, Texas. He died in San Antonio, Texas, September 21, 1895. He was interred in Glenwood Cemetery, Houston, Texas.

References
  Retrieved on 2009-04-01

External links

 
Vexillological Association of the State of Texas - The Stewart Myth Retrieved on 2010-07-16

1836 births
1895 deaths
Burials at Glenwood Cemetery (Houston, Texas)
Democratic Party Texas state senators
Confederate States Army soldiers
Texas lawyers
American prosecutors
Politicians from Memphis, Tennessee
Democratic Party members of the United States House of Representatives from Texas
19th-century American politicians
19th-century American lawyers